Sintra is both a town and a municipality in Portugal.

Sintra may also refer to:

Sintra (Santa Maria e São Miguel, São Martinho e São Pedro de Penaferrim), a civil parish within the municipality
Sintra Mountains
Palace of Sintra
Opel Sintra, a minivan

See also
Cintra (disambiguation)
Pedro de Sintra
Nova Sintra
Sintra-Cascais Natural Park
Convention of Cintra